Cosmin Muj (born 6 November 1988 in Arad, Romania) is a  Romanian aerobic gymnast. He won one gold world championships medal on the group event and one bronze European championships medal on the trio event.

References

External links

1988 births
Living people
Romanian aerobic gymnasts
Male aerobic gymnasts
Medalists at the Aerobic Gymnastics World Championships
Sportspeople from Arad, Romania